Nielepkowice  (Nelypkovychi) is a village in the administrative district of Gmina Wiązownica, within Jarosław County, Subcarpathian Voivodeship, in south-eastern Poland.

The village has an approximate population of 420.

References

Villages in Jarosław County